Brampton West—Mississauga was a provincial electoral district in central Ontario, Canada that elected one Member of the Legislative Assembly of Ontario. It was created in 1999 from Mississauga North, Brampton North and Brampton South. It was abolished in 2007 into Brampton West, Mississauga—Brampton South and  Mississauga—Streetsville.

The riding included Brampton west  of a line following McLaughlin Road to Bovaird Drive to Main Street to Steeles Avenue to Kennedy Road plus Mississauga north of a line following Winston Churchill Boulevard south to the 401 east to the Credit River south to Eglinton Avenue east to the 403 north to the 401, west to Hurontario Street and then north.

Members of Provincial Parliament

Election results

Former provincial electoral districts of Ontario
Politics of Brampton
Politics of Mississauga